Ài Sīqí is the pen name of Li Shengxuan (李生萱, 2 March 1910 – 22 March 1966), a Yunnan Mongol Chinese philosopher and author.  He was born in Tengchong, Yunnan, later traveling to Hong Kong, where he studied English and French at a Protestant school and was exposed to Sun Yat-sen’s Three Principles of the People and Marxism. He read a great deal of Marxism, including the Communist Manifesto, in Japanese translation. This reading is the root of Ai’s most important works, Dialectical Materialism and Historical Materialism (歷史唯物主義與辯証唯物主義) and Philosophy for the Masses (大眾哲學)(1948). He was a delegate to the 1st, 2nd and 3rd National People's Congress.

In the small tourist town of Heshun in Tengchong County, in western Yunnan Province, China, there is a small museum dedicated to Ai. It is based in his former house, where he lived for two years. It contains pictures, personal items and a statue of him in the yard of the compound.

Secondary literature
 Joshua A. Fogel, "Ai Siqi, Establishment Intellectual by Joshua A. Fogel", in Merle Goldman, Timothy Cheek, and Carol Lee Hamrin, eds., China's Intellectuals and the State: In Search of a New Relationship (Harvard University Asia Center, 1987).
 Joshua A. Fogel. Ai Ssu-ch'i's Contribution to the Development of Chinese Marxism. (Cambridge, Mass.: Council on East Asian Studies/Harvard UniversityHarvard Contemporary China Series,  1987).   .
 Nick Knight The Role of Philosopher to The Chinese Communist Movement: Ai Siqi, Mao Zedong and Marxist Philosophy in China //Asian Studies Review Volume 26, Issue 4, pages 419–445, December 2002
 Chenshan Tian (2002). Ai Siqi's Reading of the Marxian Notion of "Existence Versus Consciousness". Journal of Chinese Philosophy 29 (3):437–456
 Китайская философия. Энциклопедический словарь. М., 1994 — С.12-13. 

1910 births
1966 deaths
Philosophers from Yunnan
Chinese people of Mongolian descent
Members of the Chinese Academy of Sciences
Academic staff of the Counter-Japanese Military and Political University
People from Tengchong
Delegates to the 1st National People's Congress
Delegates to the 2nd National People's Congress
Delegates to the 3rd National People's Congress